Sivar or Seyvar or Siwar may refer to:
 Sivar, Isfahan
 Sivar, Kurdistan